Mstislav I Vladimirovich Monomakh (Russian: Мстислав Владимирович Великий, ; February, 1076 – April 14, 1132), also known as Mstislav the Great, was the Grand Prince of Kiev (1125–1132), the eldest son of Vladimir II Monomakh by Gytha of Wessex. He is figured prominently in the Norse Sagas under the name Harald, to allude to his grandfather, Harold II of England. Mstislav's Christian name was Theodore.

Biography
Mstislav was born in Turov. As his father's future successor, he reigned in Novgorod from 1088 to 1093 and (after a brief stint at Rostov) from 1095–1117. Thereafter he was Monomakh's co-ruler in Bilhorod Kyivskyi, and inherited the Kievan throne after his death. He built numerous churches in Novgorod, of which St. Nicholas Cathedral (1113) and the cathedral of St Anthony Cloister (1117) survive to the present day. Later, he would also erect important churches in Kiev, notably his family sepulchre at Berestovo and the church of Our Lady at Podil.

Mstislav's life was spent in constant warfare with Cumans (1093, 1107, 1111, 1129), Estonians (1111, 1113, 1116, 1130), Lithuanians (1131), and the princedom of Polotsk (1127, 1129). In 1096, he defeated his uncle Oleg of Chernigov on the Koloksha River, thereby laying foundation for the centuries of enmity between his and Oleg's descendants. Mstislav was the last ruler of united Rus, and upon his death, as the chronicler put it, "the land of Rus was torn apart". He died in Kiev, aged 55.

In 1095, Mstislav married Princess Christina Ingesdotter of Sweden, daughter of King Inge I of Sweden. They had many children:
 Ingeborg of Kiev, married Canute Lavard of Jutland,  and was mother to Valdemar I of Denmark
 Malmfred, married (1) Sigurd I of Norway; (2) Eric II of Denmark
 Eupraxia, married Alexius Comnenus, son of John II Comnenus
 Vsevolod of Novgorod and Pskov
 Maria Mstislavna of Kiev, married Vsevolod II of Kiev
 Iziaslav II of Kiev
 Rostislav of Kiev
 Sviatopolk of Pskov
 Rogneda, married Yaroslav of Volinya
 Xenia, married Briachislav of Izyaslawl

Christine died on January 18, 1122; later that year Mstislav married again, to Liubava Dmitrievna Zavidich, the daughter of Dmitry Saviditsch, a nobleman of Novgorod. Their children were:
 Vladimir III Mstislavich (1132–1171)
 Euphrosyne of Kiev, (c. 1130 – c. 1193) married King Géza II of Hungary in 1146.

Through Euphrosyne, Mstislav is an ancestor of both Philippa of Hainault and King Edward III of England, hence of all subsequent English and British monarchs. Through his mother Gytha, he is part of a link between Harold II of England and the modern line of English kings founded by William the Conqueror, who deposed him.

Ancestry

See also
 List of Russian rulers
 List of people known as The Great

References

External links
His listing in "Medieval lands" by Charles Cawley.

1076 births
1132 deaths
Monomakhovichi family
Princes of Novgorod
Princes of Rostov
Princes of Belgrod
Grand Princes of Kiev
11th-century princes in Kievan Rus'
12th-century princes in Kievan Rus'
Eastern Orthodox monarchs
People from Gomel Region